Battery Hill is a suburb of Caloundra in the Sunshine Coast Region, Queensland, Australia.

Geography 

The suburb is bounded to the north by Buderim Road, to the east by Coonowrin Drive, to the south by Cooroora Street, and to the west by the Nicklin Way.

History
The median age of the Battery Hill population was 40 years, 3 years above the national median of 37. 78.7% of people living in Battery Hill were born in Australia. The other top responses for country of birth were New Zealand 5%, England 3.9%, South Africa 0.8%, United States of America 0.8%, Netherlands 0.6%. 92.3% of people spoke only English at home; the next most common languages were 0.3% Dutch, 0.3% German, 0.3% Portuguese, 0.3% Greek, 0.3% Spanish.

In the  Battery Hill had a population of 2,536 people.

Education
There are no schools in Battery Hill. The nearest government primary schools are Currimundi State School in neighbouring Currimundi to the north-east and Talara Primary College also in Currimundi but to the north-west. The nearest government secondary schools are Caloundra State High School in neighbouring Caloundra to the south and Meridan State College in Meridan Plains to the west.

Amenities
There are a number of parks in the suburb, including:

 Andra Ahern Park
 Andrea Ahern Bushland Park
 Enfield Park
 Jack Keleher Park
 Nicklin Way Buffer 6
 Nicklin Way Buffer 8

References

External links
 

Suburbs of the Sunshine Coast Region
Caloundra